Echo Canyon Reservoir State Wildlife Area is a fishing lake and birding area in Archuleta County, Colorado.  It is stocked with rainbow trout, largemouth bass, yellow perch, green sunfish, and channel catfish.

References

Protected areas of Archuleta County, Colorado
Wildlife management areas of Colorado

Parks in Archuleta County, Colorado